Zvyozdka is a rural locality (a khutor) in Cherkesovskoye Rural Settlement, Novoanninsky District, Volgograd Oblast, Russia. The population was 49 as of 2010.

Geography 
Zvyozdka is located in forest steppe on the Khopyorsko-Buzulukskaya Plain, 38 km northeast of Novoanninsky (the district's administrative centre) by road. Verbochny is the nearest rural locality.

References 

Rural localities in Novoanninsky District